Baghelah-ye Olya or Baghleh-ye Olya may refer to:

Baghleh-ye Olya, Ilam
Baghleh-ye Olya, Kermanshah
Baghelah-ye Olya, Lorestan